Joe Borowski may refer to:
Joe Borowski (politician) (1933–1996), Canadian politician
Joe Borowski (baseball) (born 1971), American baseball pitcher